Bembecinus is a cosmopolitan genus of sand wasps belonging to the family Crabronidae. There are at least 200 described species in Bembecinus.

European species
Bembecinus carinatus Lohrman 1942
Bembecinus carpetanus (Mercet 1906)
Bembecinus crassipes (Handlirsch 1895)
Bembecinus cyprius Beaumont 1954
Bembecinus hungaricus (Frivaldszky 1876)
Bembecinus insulanus Beaumont 1954
Bembecinus meridionalis A. Costa 1859
Bembecinus peregrinus (F. Smith 1856)
Bembecinus pulchellus (Mercet 1906)
Bembecinus tridens (Fabricius 1781)

See also
 List of Bembecinus species

References

Further reading

External links

 

Crabronidae
Apoidea genera
Taxa named by Achille Costa